The 1956 Australian Tourist Trophy was a 100-mile motor race for sports cars, staged at the Albert Park Circuit in Melbourne, Victoria, Australia on 25 November 1956. It was the first in a sequence of annual Australian Tourist Trophy races, each of these being recognised by the Confederation of Australian Motor Sport as the Australian Championship for sports cars. The race was won by Stirling Moss driving a Maserati 300S.

Class Structure
Cars competed in five classes based on engine capacity:

 Open
 2701 - 3000cc
 1501 - 2700cc
 1101 - 1500cc
 Up to 1100cc

Class awards were restricted to Australian residents only.

Results

Notes
 Race distance: 32 laps - 100 miles
 Starters: 34
 Winner's race time: 1h 3m 24.2s (94.6 mph)
 Fastest lap: Stirling Moss - 1:55.8 (97.15 mph) Sports car lap record
 First Australian driver: Bill Pitt
 Joseph Lucas Trophy (for driver of the first British car): Bill Pitt

Notes & references

External links
 Image of Stirling Moss (Maserati 300S) at the 1956 Australian Tourist Trophy, www.motorsportarchive.com

Australian Tourist Trophy
Tourist Trophy
Motorsport at Albert Park
November 1956 sports events in Australia